Wesley Augusto Henn Marth (born 5 March 2000), commonly known as Wesley, is a Brazilian footballer who plays for Tombense.

Career statistics

Club

Notes

References

2000 births
Living people
Brazilian footballers
Brazilian expatriate footballers
Association football defenders
Figueirense FC players
Club Athletico Paranaense players
Grêmio Foot-Ball Porto Alegrense players
Tombense Futebol Clube players
FC Porto players
FC Porto B players
Brazilian expatriate sportspeople in Portugal
Expatriate footballers in Portugal